Ali Abdi is a Professor of Electrical and Computer Engineering at the New Jersey Institute of Technology.

In 2019, Abdi was elected as a Fellow of the Institute of Electrical and Electronics Engineers for "contributions to wireless channel modeling and underwater communications".

References

External links 
Ali Adbi at Google Scholar

Fellow Members of the IEEE
New Jersey Institute of Technology faculty
Living people
Year of birth missing (living people)